Alma Macbride (born April 21, 1995) is an American filmmaker and artist based in New York City. She is the daughter of classical pianist David Macbride and painter Lisa Macbride, and the younger sister of jazz drummer and composer Jimmy Macbride.

Biography 
Macbride graduated from the Harvard University, where she studied film production with Robb Moss and Guy Maddin. She also has a wide musical background, and was taught piano from the age of 4. She picked up jazz piano at the age of 8, and has composed music thereafter, for which she has won an ASCAP Award and full scholarships to Grammy Camp and the Skidmore Jazz Institute. She has performed with a series of musicians like Jimmy Greene, Wynton Marsalis, and the Jazz at Lincoln Center Orchestra.

Honors 
  2012: Recipient of the ASCAP Young Jazz Composers Award for the composition Full House

References

External links 
 

1995 births
Living people
American jazz pianists
American jazz composers
Juilliard School alumni
Harvard University alumni
21st-century American women pianists
21st-century American pianists
Musicians from Hartford, Connecticut